Marcel Paul Pagnol (28 February 1895 – 18 April 1974) was a French novelist, playwright, and filmmaker. Regarded as an auteur, in 1946, he became the first filmmaker elected to the Académie française. Although his work is less fashionable than it once was, Pagnol is still generally regarded as one of France's greatest 20th-century writers and is notable for the fact that he excelled in almost every medium—memoir, novel, drama and film.

Early life
Pagnol was born on 28 February 1895 in Aubagne, Bouches-du-Rhône department, in southern France near Marseille, the eldest son of schoolteacher Joseph Pagnol and seamstress Augustine Lansot. Marcel Pagnol grew up in Marseille with his younger brothers Paul and René, and younger sister Germaine.

School years 
In July 1904, the family rented the Bastide Neuve, – a house in the sleepy Provençal village of La Treille – for the summer holidays, the first of many spent in the hilly countryside between Aubagne and Marseille. About the same time, Augustine's health, which had never been robust, began to noticeably decline and on 16 June 1910 she succumbed to a chest infection ("mal de poitrine") and died, aged 36. Joseph remarried in 1912.

In 1913, at the age of 18, Marcel passed his baccalaureate in philosophy and started studying literature at the University in Aix-en-Provence. When World War I broke out, he was called up into the infantry at Nice but in January 1915 he was discharged because of his poor constitution ("faiblesse de constitution''''). On 2 March 1916, he married Simone Colin in Marseille and in November graduated in English. He became an English teacher, teaching in various local colleges and at a lycée in Marseille.

Career

 Time in Paris
In 1922, he moved to Paris, where he taught English until 1927, when he decided instead to devote his life to playwriting. During this time, he belonged to a group of young writers, in collaboration with one of whom, Paul Nivoix, he wrote the play, Merchants of Glory, which was produced in 1924. This was followed, in 1928, by Topaze, a satire based on ambition. Exiled in Paris, he returned nostalgically to his Provençal roots, taking this as his setting for his play Marius, which later became the first of his works to be adapted into a film in 1931.

Separated from Simone Collin since 1926 (though not divorced until 1941), he formed a relationship with the young English dancer Kitty Murphy. Their son Jacques Pagnol was born on 24 September 1930. (Jacques later became his father's assistant and subsequently a cameraman for France 3 Marseille.)

 Filmmaking career 
In 1929, on a visit to London, Pagnol attended a screening of one of the first talking films and he was so impressed that he decided to devote his efforts to cinema. He contacted Paramount Picture studios and suggested adapting his play Marius for cinema. This was directed by Alexander Korda and released on 10 October 1931. It became one of the first successful French-language talking films.

In 1932 Pagnol founded his own film production studios in the countryside near Marseille. Over the next decade Pagnol produced his own films, taking many different roles in the production – financier, director, script writer, studio head, and foreign-language script translator – and employing the greatest French actors of the period. On 4 April 1946, Pagnol was elected to the Académie française, taking his seat in March 1947, the first filmmaker to receive this honour.

 Themes of Pagnol's films 
In his films, Pagnol transfers his playwriting talents onto the big screen. His editing style is somberly reserved, placing emphasis on the content of an image. As a pictorial naturalist, Pagnol relies on film as art to convey a deeper meaning rather than solely as a tool to tell a story. Pagnol also took great care in the type of actors he employed, hiring local actors to appear in his films to highlight their unique accents and culture. Like his plays, Pagnol's films emphasize dialogue and musicality. The themes of many of Pagnol's films revolve around the acute observation of social rituals. Using interchangeable symbols and recurring character roles, such as proud fathers and rebellious children, Pagnol illuminates the provincial life of the lower class. Notably, Pagnol also frequently compares women and land, showing both can be barren or fertile. Above all, Pagnol uses all this to illustrate the importance of human bonds and their renewal.

 As a novelist 
In 1945, Pagnol remarried, to Jacqueline Bouvier (the actress Jacqueline Pagnol). They had two children together, Frédéric (born 1946) and Estelle (born 1949). Estelle died at the age of two. Pagnol  was so devastated that he fled the south and returned to live in Paris. He went back to writing plays, but after his next piece was badly received he decided to change his job once more and began writing a series of autobiographical novels – Souvenirs d'enfance – based on his childhood experiences.

In 1957, the first two novels in the series, La Gloire de mon père and Le château de ma mère were published to instant acclaim. The third Le Temps des secrets was published in 1959, the fourth Le Temps des Amours was to remain unfinished and was not published until 1977, after his death. In the meantime, Pagnol turned to a second series, L'Eau des Collines – Jean de Florette and Manon des Sources – which focused on the machinations of Provençal peasant life at the beginning of the twentieth century and were published in 1962.

Pagnol adapted his own film Manon des Sources, with his wife Jacqueline in the title role, into two novels, Jean de Florette and Manon des Sources, collectively titled L'Eau des Collines.

Death
Marcel Pagnol died in Paris on 18 April 1974. He is buried in Marseille at the cemetery La Treille, along with his mother, father, brothers, and wife. His boyhood friend, David Magnan (Lili des Bellons in the autobiographies), died at the Second Battle of the Marne in July 1918, and is buried nearby.

 Translations 
Pagnol was also known for his translations of Shakespeare (from English) and Virgil (from Latin):
1944 : Le Songe d'une nuit d'été (A Midsummer Night's Dream) by William Shakespeare, first presented in 1947, at the Grand Théâtre de Monaco; Paris, Œuvres complètes, Club de l'Honnête Homme, 1971
1947 : Hamlet by William Shakespeare, Paris, Nagel
1958 : Bucoliques (The Eclogues) by Virgil, Paris, Grasset

Pagnol's Hamlet is still performed in France, although some have criticized his portrayal of Hamlet as somewhat effeminate.

 Film adaptations 

In 1986, Jean de Florette and Manon des Sources were adapted by filmmaker Claude Berri.

In 1990, La Gloire de mon père and Le château de ma mère, Pagnol's affectionate reminiscences of childhood, were filmed by Yves Robert.

In 2000, Jacques Nahum produced Marius, Fanny, and César for French television.

In 2011, La Fille du puisatier was filmed by Daniel Auteuil.

In 2013, Marius and Fanny were remade by Daniel Auteuil.

 Awards 
 1939: Best foreign film for Harvest - New York Film Critics Circle Awards
 1940: Best foreign film for The Baker's Wife - New York Film Critics Circle Awards
 1950: Best foreign film for Jofroi - New York Film Critics Circle Awards

 Tribute 
On 28 February 2020 Google celebrated his 125th birthday with a Google Doodle.

Filmography
 Marius (1931)
 Fanny (1932)
 Jofroi (1934)
 Angèle (1934)
 Merlusse (1935)
 Cigalon (1935)
 Topaze (1936), first version
 César (1936)
 Regain (1937)
 Le Schpountz (1938)
 La Femme du boulanger (1938)
 Monsieur Brotonneau (1939)
 La Fille du puisatier (1940); remade in 2011
 La Prière aux étoiles (1941, unfinished)
 Naïs (1945)
 The Pretty Miller Girl (1949, in colour)
 The Ways of Love (1950)
 The Prize (1950)
 Topaze (1951, starring Fernandel), second version
 Manon des Sources (1952) (later novelized as L'eau des collines; remade in 1986 in two parts as Jean de Florette and Manon des Sources)
 Letters from My Windmill (Les Lettres de mon moulin) (1954)

Bibliography
 Merchants of Glory (1925, theatre play)
 Jazz (1926, theatre play)
 Topaze (1928, theatre play)
 Marius (1929, theatre play)
 Fanny (1932, theatre play)
 César (1936, theatre play)
 La Gloire de mon père and Le Château de ma mère (1957, autobiographies)
 Le Temps des secrets (1959, autobiography)
 L'Eau des collines (Jean de Florette and Manon des Sources) (1963, novels)
 Le Temps des amours (1977, autobiography)
 Le Masque de Fer (1965, essay)
 Le secret du Masque de Fer (1973, essay; 2nd expanded edition)

See also
Lycée Français International Marcel Pagnol

Notes
 Born 25 October 1869. Died 8 November 1951, age 82.
 Born 11 September 1873. Died 16 June 1910, age 36.

References

Sources

 Castans, Raymond (1987). Marcel Pagnol''. Éditions Jean-Claude Lattès.

External links

  Official website
 
 

 
1895 births
1974 deaths
People from Aubagne
Members of the Académie Française
French film directors
French screenwriters
French film producers
20th-century French dramatists and playwrights
20th-century French novelists
Writers from Provence-Alpes-Côte d'Azur
French military personnel of World War I
French people of Spanish descent
French male novelists
20th-century French male writers
Commandeurs of the Ordre des Palmes Académiques
César Honorary Award recipients
Latin–French translators
English–French translators
Translators of William Shakespeare
Translators of Virgil
20th-century French screenwriters